Wola Mikorska  is a village in the administrative district of Gmina Bełchatów, within Bełchatów County, Łódź Voivodeship, in central Poland.

The village has a population of 210.

References

Wola Mikorska